Chavano Rainer "Buddy" Hield (born December 17, 1992) is a Bahamian professional basketball player for the Indiana Pacers of the National Basketball Association (NBA). He was named the Big 12 Conference Men's Basketball Player of the Year in 2015 and 2016, and in 2016, he received four major national player of the year awards—the John R. Wooden Award, the Naismith Award, Sporting News Player of the Year, and the Oscar Robertson Trophy. Hield was selected with the sixth overall pick in the 2016 NBA draft by the New Orleans Pelicans and was traded to the Sacramento Kings in 2017. He was dealt to the Indiana Pacers in 2022.

Early life
Hield grew up in Eight Mile Rock, a coastal region west of Freeport, in the West Grand Bahama district in the Bahamas. He was fifth of seven children of his mother Jackie Braynen. Hield received his nickname from his mother after Bud Bundy of the sitcom Married... with Children.

Hield was first featured in high school by The All Bahamian Brand, a basketball magazine from the Bahamas. Hield, as a young eighth-grader, was rated by the All Bahamian Brand as the best eighth-grader in the Bahamas and one to watch.

Hield showed his early ability to lead his team from a young age by taking his Jack Hayward High School basketball team to the championship of the Providence Holiday Tournament on a buzzer-beater and also leading his team to win the Grand Bahamas High School Championships. For his exploits, Hield was named an All Bahamian Brand All Bahamian Selection.

After his performances in The Bahamas, Hield was recruited to attend Sunrise Christian Academy in Bel Aire, a basketball prep school in a suburb of Wichita, Kansas. Former Wichita State assistant and then-Sunrise coach Kyle Lindsted recruited the 6-foot 4-inch (1.93 m) guard. In 2011, during Hield's junior year at Sunrise Christian he led the team to the National Association of Christian Athletes national championship, getting named the MVP of the tourney. In the 2011-2012 season, his senior year, Hield averaged 22.7 points on .491 shooting in 21.0 minutes per game.

He was highly recruited and selected the Oklahoma Sooners over the Kansas Jayhawks.

College career

As a freshman at Oklahoma, Hield scored 7.8 points per game, and was the recipient of the team's Most Inspirational Award. He was a second-team All-Big 12 selection as a sophomore as he averaged 16.5 points, 4.4 rebounds and 1.4 steals per game. He worked on his defense prior to his junior year and expanded his offensive game to more of a high-volume three-point shooter.

Hield averaged 17.4 points and 5.4 rebounds per game as a junior at Oklahoma and shot 41 percent from the field. He led Oklahoma to a 24–11 record and Sweet 16 berth. Despite being a potential 2015 NBA draft selection, he decided to return for his senior season. He was a First Team All-Big 12 selection and was named Big 12 Conference Men's Basketball Player of the Year.

Hield was listed on the Oscar Robertson Award preseason watchlist as well as the Naismith College Player of the Year preseason watchlist. Hield recorded a career high of 46 points in a triple overtime loss to Kansas on January 4, 2016, receiving a standing ovation from the opposing crowd after a postgame interview with Scott Van Pelt. His 46 points tied the record for most points scored by an opponent at Allen Fieldhouse. He was named to the 35-man midseason watchlist for the Naismith Trophy on February 11.

Following his senior year at Oklahoma, Hield won the John R. Wooden Award on April 7, 2016, as the best college basketball player for the 2015–16 season, in which he averaged 25 points, 5.7 rebounds, two assists per game, and led the nation in three-point shots.

Professional career

New Orleans Pelicans (2016–2017)
On June 23, 2016, Hield was selected by the New Orleans Pelicans with the sixth overall pick in the 2016 NBA draft. On July 22, 2016, he signed with the Pelicans. On December 15, 2016, he had his best outing as a Pelican with 21 points and five three-pointers in a 102–95 win over the Indiana Pacers. On January 3, 2017, he was named Western Conference Rookie of the Month for December.

Sacramento Kings (2017–2022)
On February 20, 2017, Hield was traded, along with Tyreke Evans, Langston Galloway and 2017 first-round and second-round draft picks, to the Sacramento Kings for DeMarcus Cousins and Omri Casspi. He made his debut for the Kings three days later, scoring 16 points off the bench in a 116–100 win over the Denver Nuggets. He was named Western Conference Rookie of the Month for March. On April 11, he set a new career high with 30 points in a 129–104 win over the Phoenix Suns. At the season's end, he was named to the NBA All-Rookie First Team.

Hield began the 2017–18 season as a starter before switching to a bench role and becoming the team's sixth man after seven games. On November 25, 2017, Hield scored a season-high 27 points off the bench with a career-high seven 3-pointers in a 97–95 loss to the Los Angeles Clippers. Hield shot 43.1 percent from 3-point range in 2017–18, which placed him ninth in the NBA among qualified players.

In December 2018, Hield had a seven-game streak with 20 points or more. On January 5, he scored 32 points and had a career-high eight 3-pointers in a 127–123 loss to the Warriors. On January 19, 2019, Hield made an off-balance, fadeaway 3-pointer just before time expired and scored 35 points in a 103–101 win over the Detroit Pistons. On March 23, he had 25 points and the franchise season record for 3-pointers in a 112–103 win over the Suns. He made 7 of 14 shots from beyond the arc, giving him 245 3-pointers for the season and surpassing the mark of 240 set by Peja Stojaković in 2003–04. In April, he broke Damian Lillard's NBA record (599) for most 3-pointers made in a player's first three seasons.

On October 21, 2019, Hield signed a four-year contract extension. On December 26, Hield accused coaches and teammates of having "trust issues" after he was benched late in regulation of a game that the Kings eventually lost in double overtime to the Minnesota Timberwolves. He apologized to the entire team the next day for his remarks. Hield eventually lost his starting spot to Bogdan Bogdanović, but the switch produced a boost in his production and efficiency; in only his second game off the bench, on January 27, 2020, and again against the Timberwolves, Hield scored a career-high 42 points to lead the Kings to a 133–129 overtime victory. Afterwards, Hield dedicated the game to his idol Kobe Bryant, who died in a helicopter accident the day prior. On February 15, Hield won the Three-Point Contest at NBA All-Star Weekend in Chicago, topping Devin Booker 27–26 in the final round.

On December 23, 2020, Hield recorded 22 points, four rebounds, and three assists, alongside a game-winning, buzzer-beating tip-in, in a 124–122 overtime win against the Denver Nuggets. On February 28, 2021, Hield became the fastest player in history to make 1,000 3-pointers, needing 350 games only to reach the mark.

On July 29, 2021, it was reported that the Kings were moving towards a deal sending Hield to the Los Angeles Lakers in exchange for forwards Kyle Kuzma and Montrezl Harrell. The deal fell through as the Lakers ended up trading Kuzma and Harrell in a package to the Washington Wizards for Russell Westbrook.

Indiana Pacers (2022–present)
On February 8, 2022, Hield, Tyrese Haliburton, and Tristan Thompson were traded to the Indiana Pacers in exchange for Justin Holiday, Jeremy Lamb, Domantas Sabonis, and a 2023 second-round pick. On February 11, Hield made his debut for the Pacers, starting alongside Haliburton in a 120–113 loss to the Cleveland Cavaliers, recording a near triple double with 16 points, eight assists and nine rebounds. On February 15, Hield scored a season-high 36 points on 8–12 three-point shooting, while dishing out four assists in a 128–119 loss to the Milwaukee Bucks. 

On December 5, Hield became the second-fastest player in NBA history to reach 1,500 career three-pointers, only behind Steph Curry. On December 27, Hield tied a then season-high 28 points on 6–7 three-point shooting, along with 9 rebounds in a 129–114 win over the Atlanta Hawks. On December 29, with a three–pointer against the Cleveland Cavaliers just three seconds into the game, Hield scored the fastest field–goal recorded in NBA history since the 1996–97 NBA season, passing Hall of Fame Pacer Reggie Miller. 

On January 11, 2023, Hield posted a new season-high 31 points, 8 rebounds, and 7–15 three-point shooting in a loss to the New York Knicks. On February 15, Hield put up 27 points in a 117–113 win over the Chicago Bulls. He also made his 230th three-pointer of the season, surpassing Reggie Miller for the most three-pointers made in a season in Pacers history. Hield and All–Star teammate Tyrese Haliburton were both selected to participate in the 2023 NBA Three-Point Contest, where they both lost in the finals to Damian Lillard.

Career statistics

NBA

Regular season

|-
| style="text-align:left;" rowspan=2|
| style="text-align:left;"|New Orleans
| 57 || 37 || 20.4 || .393 || .369 || .879 || 2.9 || 1.4 || .3 || .1 || 8.6
|-
| style="text-align:left;"|Sacramento
| 25 || 18 || 29.1 || .480 || .428 || .814 || 4.1 || 1.8 || .8 || .1 || 15.1
|-
| style="text-align:left;"|
| style="text-align:left;"|Sacramento
| 80 || 12 || 25.3 || .446 || .431 || .877 || 3.8 || 1.9 || 1.1 || .3 || 13.5
|-
| style="text-align:left;"|
| style="text-align:left;"|Sacramento
| style="background:#cfecec;"|   82* || style="background:#cfecec;"|    82* || 31.9 || .458 || .427 || .886 || 5.0 || 2.5 || .7 || .4 || 20.7
|-
| style="text-align:left;"|
| style="text-align:left;"|Sacramento
| 72 || 44 || 30.8 || .429 || .394 || .846 || 4.6 || 3.0 || .9 || .2 || 19.2
|-
| style="text-align:left;"|
| style="text-align:left;"|Sacramento
| 71 || 71 || 34.3 || .406 || .391 || .846 || 4.7 || 3.6 || .9 || .4 || 16.6
|-
| style="text-align:left;"rowspan=2|
| style="text-align:left;"|Sacramento
| 55 || 6 || 28.6 || .382 || .368 || .870 || 4.0 || 1.9 || .9 || .3 || 14.4
|-
| style="text-align:left;"|Indiana
| 26 || 26 || 35.6 || .447 || .362 || .886 || 5.1 || 4.8 || .9 || .4 || 18.2
|- class="sortbottom"
| style="text-align:center;" colspan="2"|Career
| 468 || 296 || 29.2 || .430 || .398 || .865 || 4.3 || 2.5 || .8 || .3 || 15.9

College

|-
| style="text-align:left;"|2012–13 
| style="text-align:left;"|Oklahoma 
| 27 || 13 || 25.1 || .388 || .238 || .833 || 4.2 || 1.9 || 1.2 || .3 || 7.8
|-
| style="text-align:left;"|2013–14 
| style="text-align:left;"|Oklahoma 
| 33 || 33 || 32.1 || .445 || .386 || .750 || 4.4 || 1.9 || 1.4 || .2 || 16.5
|-
| style="text-align:left;"|2014–15
| style="text-align:left;"|Oklahoma 
| 35 || 35 || 32.4 || .412 || .359 || .823 || 5.4 || 1.9 || 1.3 || .2 || 17.4
|-
| style="text-align:left;"|2015–16
| style="text-align:left;"|Oklahoma
| 37 || 37 || 35.4 || .501 || .457 || .880 || 5.7 || 2.0 || 1.1 || .5 || 25.0
|- class="sortbottom"
| style="text-align:center;" colspan="2"|Career
| 132 || 118 || 31.7 || .448 || .390 || .836 || 5.0 || 1.9 || 1.3 || .3 || 17.4

National team career
Hield traveled to the city of Tepic in Nayarit, Mexico from August 1 to 7, 2014 to represent the Bahamas national team in the 2014 Centrobasket, which is the regional basketball championship of FIBA Americas for the Central American and Caribbean subzone. Hield's coach in the tournament was Larry Eustachy. He averaged a tournament-leading 19.8 points per game and a team-high 6.0 rebounds.

Personal life
Hield's first child, a daughter, was born in 2017.

In the days after Hurricane Dorian struck the Bahamas, Hield donated $105,000 to the Hurricane Dorian Relief fund and created a GoFundMe page to help raise an extra $1,000,000 to help families devastated by the hurricane there.

See also

 List of National Basketball Association career 3-point scoring leaders
 List of NCAA Division I men's basketball season 3-point field goal leaders

References

External links

 Oklahoma Sooners bio

1992 births
Living people
All-American college men's basketball players
Bahamian Christians
Bahamian expatriate basketball people in the United States
Bahamian men's basketball players
Indiana Pacers players
National Basketball Association players from the Bahamas
New Orleans Pelicans draft picks
New Orleans Pelicans players
Oklahoma Sooners men's basketball players
People from Freeport, Bahamas
People from West Grand Bahama
Sacramento Kings players
Shooting guards